Bentworth may refer to:

Bentworth, a village in Hampshire
Bentworth and Lasham railway station, a former railway station near the village
Bentworth School District, a public school system serving Bentleyville, Ellsworth, Cokeburg, North Bethlehem Township and Somerset Township in Washington County, Pennsylvania.